Tarmo Koivisto (born 3 July 1948 in Orivesi) is a Finnish comics artist and writer, cartoonist, and graphic artist. He is best known for his ongoing comic strip Mämmilä. Koivisto is also known by his artist name Tape.

Biography
Koivisto graduated from the Academy of Fine Arts in 1974. He has also participated in Will Eisner's "mastership class" in 1990.

Koivisto is one of the best known comics artists in Finland. His main work, Mämmilä, has achieved country-wide fame. Made in co-operation with Osuuskunta Käyttökuva, the strip was first continuously published in Me magazine from 1976 to 1983. After this, the strip was published on the back page of the Helsingin Sanomat monthly supplement. The newspaper published it for 13 years, up until 1996.

Since 1997, the monthly supplement has published Koivisto's political satire comic strip Pääkaupunki.

Koivisto has received many awards, including the Puupäähattu in 1978, the Krokodil statue in 1980, the Strippi-Lempi in 1989, the Lempi Grand Prix in 1991, the State Arts Awards in 1992 and the Orivesi Cultural Award in 1996. He received a 5-year artist's allowance from the state in 1997.

Koivisto has taught comics classes in Africa and India, bringing aid to the developing countries through comics. The project includes Comics with an Attitude, published both as a book and on the Internet.

Publications

Comics published in magazines and newspapers
 Jumaluut! (Helmiä sioille 2. 1972)
 Viimeiset viheltäjät (Sarjis 1/1972)
 Pako (Sarjis 3/1972)
 Riku Rokuli & Co. (Sarjis 2/1973, 4/1973)
 Konttori (Sarjis 2/1974)
 Paluu alkuun (Sarjis 4/1974 and Mammut 3/1981, Sweden)
 Unto Uneksija, created by Joonas (Pellervo 1972-1975)
 Mämmilä (Suomen Sanoma, Me 1976-1983 and Helsingin Sanomat monthly supplement 1983-1996)
 Tää kaupunki/Pääkaupunki (Helsingin Sanomat monthly supplement 1997-, written by Esa Keron, Jouni K. Kemppainen and Mikko Vienonen)
 Apina Kapina (Kauppa ja koti 1973–1986, syndicated together with Wallu 1987-1990)
 Parteam (Partek tänään/i dag/today 1994-)
 Meno päällä (Caravan 1990-1993)
 Laatikko (Kulttuurivihkot 1979 and Kupla 1981)
 Hyvä tietää (Me 1980-1981)
 Sallila (Terveydeksi 1997-)

Albums
 Several Mämmilä albums
 ApinaKapina, produced by Jussi Karjalainen (Jalava, 1994)
 Tää pääkaupunki (Otava, 2003)

Illustrations and children's books
 Seitsemän myyttiä hashiksesta, valistus-ja keskusteluaineisto nuorille (Seven myths about hashish, education and discussion for the young), edited by Heikki Jokinen (Bourgeois abstinence foundation, 1988)
 Hei, juna tulee! (Hey, the train is coming!) (Children's centre, 1991)
 Hei, kaikki toimii! Lasten energiakirja (Hey, everything works! Children's energy book) (Children's centre 1995, also published in Ireland, Portugal, Estonia, and Sweden)
 Ranskanperunapotku (French fry kick), Lauri Törhönen (Otava, 2002)

External links
 Tarmo Koivisto at Lambiek.net
 Bande dessinée finlandaise Interview: Tarmo Koivisto

1948 births
Finnish comics artists
Finnish graphic designers
Finnish comic strip cartoonists
Finnish caricaturists
Living people
People from Orivesi
20th-century Finnish male artists
21st-century Finnish male artists